"Vaninsky Port" or "I Remember That Port in Vanino" is a popular Russian folk song of the USSR epoch, which is often called an anthem of Soviet GULAG prisoners on Kolyma. Time of writing is unknown. A Kolyma prisoner A.G. Morozov asserted he had heard it in autumn 1947. He dated its writing by 1946–1947 years (the construction of the Vanino port was completed on June 20, 1945). It was attributed and self-attributed to a number of authors, including a repressed poets Nikolai Zabolotsky, Boris Ruchyov and even to executed by shooting in 1938, Boris Kornilov. Alexander Voznesensky told about F.M. Demin-Blagoveschensky. A Magadan littérateur A.M. Biryukov has researched this issue and showed very convincingly that its author was Konstantin Sarakhanov.
 
The song is named for the port in the village Vanino, on the Pacific coast of Russia. The Vanino port was a transit point for transportation of deported  Gulag prisoners who followed the Kolyma. At the station and the port of Vanino there was overloading prisoners from trains on ships following to Magadan - an administrative center of "Dalstroy" and Sevvostlag.

Lyrics 

The modern version of the song:

References

Gulag in literature and arts
Political repression in the Soviet Union
Soviet songs
1940s songs
Songwriter unknown